The Latvia University of Life Sciences and Technologies ( (LBTU)), previously Latvia University of Agriculture (LUA;  (LLU)), is a university in Jelgava, Latvia, specializing in agricultural science, forestry, food technology and related areas.

History 
The university originated as the Agricultural Department at the Riga Polytechnical Institute in 1863, which in 1919 became the Faculty of Agriculture at the University of Latvia. It became an independent institution in 1939, when it was established as the Academy of Agriculture in the Jelgava Palace, which had been renovated for that purpose. It was renamed to the Latvia University of Agriculture in 1990 and Latvia University of Life Sciences and Technologies in 2018.

Organisation
The university consists of 8 faculties offering the following study programmes:

 Faculty of Economics and Social Development (2013)
Economics
Business Studies
Entrepreneurship and Business Management
Business Management
Financial Management 
 Faculty of Information Technologies (2001)
Computer Control and Computer Science (Bachelor)
Information Technologies for Sustainable Development (Software Engineering bachelor)
Information Technologies (Master)
Information Technologies (PhD)
 Faculty of Agriculture (1863)
Agriculture
Agricultural Entrepreneurship
Agronomist with Specialization in Zootechnics
Field Crops
Horticulture

 Faculty of Environment and Civil Engineering (1947)
Civil Engineering and Construction
Land Surveying and Management
Environmental Science
Landscape Architecture
Landscape Architecture and Planning
Water Management
Environment and Water Management
Environmental Engineering

 Forest Faculty (1920)
Forestry Science
Forest Ecology and Silviculture
Forest Works and Machinery
Forest Economics and Policy
Wood Materials and Technology
Forestry
Wood Processing Technology
Wood Processing
Labour Safety
Forest Engineering

 Faculty of Food Technology (1948)
Food Product Technology (Professional bachelor)
Food Quality and Innovations (Bachelor)
Catering and Hotel Management (Bachelor)
Food Science (Master)
Nutrition Science (Master)
Food Science (PhD)

 Faculty of Engineering (1944)
Agricultural Engineering
Technical Expert
Agricultural Power Engineering
Machine Design and Manufacturing
Home Environment in Education
Teacher of Vocational Education
Pedagogy
Career Counsellor

 Faculty of Veterinary Medicine (1919)
Veterinary Medicine
Food Hygiene (Master)

Rankings 
Latvia University of Life Sciences (LLU) is ranked in the 1001+ bracket in Times Higher Education World University Rankings 2020. LLU has been ranked 174th among EECA (Eastern Europe and Central Asia) universities. LLU is also ranked in Multirank and other well-known university ranks.

Rectors
 (1939–1940, 1941–1944)
 (1940–1941)
Jānis Ostrovs (1941)
 (1944)
Jānis Peive (1944–1950)
Amālija Cekuliņa (1950–1954)
 (1954–1961) 
Pāvils Zariņš (1961–1966)
Olģerts Ozols (1966–1976)
 (1976–1980) 
Viktors Timofejevs (1980–1986)
Imants Gronskis (1986–1992)
 (1992–2002)
Pēteris Bušmanis (2002–2004)
Juris Skujāns (2004–2014)
Irina Pilvere (2014–present)

Notable alumni
 Andris Šķēle – Prime Minister of Latvia and industrialist
 Aigars Kalvītis – Prime Minister of Latvia and CEO of Latvijas Gāze
 Roberts Zīle – Member of the European Parliament and co-chairman of the National Alliance
 Atis Slakteris – Minister of Defence of Latvia
 Andris Ārgalis – Mayor of Riga
 Uldis Sesks – Mayor of Liepāja and chairman of the Liepāja Special Economic Zone
 Jānis Urbanovičs – Member of the Saeima and chairman of the Harmony party
 Vilnis Edvīns Bresis – Last Chairman of the Council of Ministers of the Latvian SSR
 Jānis Dūklavs – Minister of Agriculture of Latvia
 Dzintars Jaundžeikars – Minister of the Interior of Latvia
 Dace Reinika – Member of the Saeima and Mayor of Tērvete

References

External links

 
Universities in Latvia
Jelgava